Place Moulin Dam is one of the largest dams in Europe and is in Bionaz, in Northern Italy. The 678 m long and 155 m high arch dam was constructed between 1955 and 1965 and has an artificial reservoir capable of holding 105 million m3 of water.

Structure
The dam has a 137 km2 catchment basin, with nearly 20% of it being made up of glacier run offs. The dam has a 47 m high base and 6.43 m thick summit, designed to ensure easier inspection. The dam also has two perimeter tunnels and eight horizontal tunnels allowing for technicians to easily walk through them for inspection. The reservoir was first filled in 1967.

See also
 http://www.comune.bionaz.ao.it/Portals/Bionaz/download/DigaPlaceMoulin.pdf - Original Brochure Published in 1967

References 

Dams completed in 1965
Dams in Italy
1965 establishments in Italy
Buildings and structures in Aosta Valley